Keith Barr McCutcheon (August 10, 1915 – July 13, 1971) was a highly decorated Marine Corps four-star general and aviator seeing combat in World War II, the Korean War, and the Vietnam War. He earned the Distinguished Flying Cross and  ten Air Medals.

Early years
Keith McCutcheon  was born on August 10, 1915, in East Liverpool, Ohio. He graduated from East Liverpool High School and received his B.S. degree from Carnegie Institute of Technology in 1937. An honor graduate of the schools' ROTC unit, he resigned a U.S. Army Reserve commission to accept appointment as a Marine Corps second lieutenant on July 1, 1937.

Marine Corps career
He later completed aeronautical engineering courses at the U.S. Naval Postgraduate School and the Massachusetts Institute of Technology, earning his master's degree in 1944.

World War II
In September 1944, as a lieutenant colonel, he departed for the Pacific area. He served as Operations Officer of Marine Aircraft Group 24 at Bougainville, and at Luzon and Mindanao in the Philippine Islands. Additionally, he saw duty as Operations Officer of Marine Aircraft Groups, Dagupan on Luzon and, later, Zamboanga, on Mindanao. During the period  from November 1, 1944, to May 26, 1945, he earned the Silver Star, the Legion of Merit with Combat "V", the Distinguished Flying Cross, and six Air Medals in the Solomons, New Guinea, and Philippine Islands area.

In November 1945, he returned to the United States to serve as an instructor in the Aviation Section, Marine Corps Schools, Quantico. From October 1946 until December 1949, he was assigned to the Bureau of Aeronautics, Navy Department, in Washington, D.C. He served in the Guided Missiles (then Pilotless Aircraft) Division of the Design and Engineering Group, and was branch chief at various times of the Liaison, Experimental Projects, and Target Drone branches. He also performed additional duty in 1947 as Senior Marine Corps Aide to the White House.

1950s

Marine Helicopter Squadron One
Lieutenant Colonel McCutcheon was transferred to Norfolk in January 1950 and completed the course at the Armed Forces Staff College in June 1950. He was then ordered to Quantico for duty as commanding officer of Marine Helicopter Squadron One (HMX-One), the Corps' only helicopter squadron at that time. During the next 18 months, HMX-One served as a focal point for the expansion of the Marine Corps Helicopter program. He was promoted to colonel in June 1951.

Korean War
In December 1951, Colonel McCutcheon took command of Marine Helicopter Transport Squadron 161 in Korea. He earned his second Legion of Merit with Combat "V" and his seventh through tenth Air Medals in this capacity. In October 1952, he reported to Headquarters, United States European Command, in Frankfurt, Germany, where he served successively as operations officer, assistant chief, and later chief, Operations Branch, J-3 Division until May 1954.

Colonel McCutcheon assumed duties in June 1954 as chief, Air Section, Marine Corps Equipment Board, Quantico. In August 1957, he reported as commanding officer, MAG-26, at New River, North Carolina. He commanded the helicopter group until June 1959, when he was detached to enter the National War College in Washington.

1960s

Following graduation, he was assigned to Headquarters Marine Corps in July 1960 as assistant director of aviation, becoming Director of Aviation in September 1961. In March 1962, he was promoted to brigadier general and assumed command of the Hawaii-based 1st Marine Brigade. Remaining in Hawaii, General McCutcheon joined the staff of the commander in chief, Pacific, in January 1963 as assistant chief of staff for operations. For exceptionally meritorious service in this capacity from 1963 to 1965, he was awarded his third Legion of Merit.

Vietnam War
Ordered to the Republic of Vietnam in June 1965, General McCutcheon earned his first Distinguished Service Medal for service as commanding general, 1st Marine Aircraft Wing and as deputy commander, III Marine Amphibious Force. He was also awarded the Vietnamese Cross of Gallantry with Palm, and the Vietnamese Medal of Honor (First Class). In January 1966, he was promoted to major general while serving in Vietnam.

Upon his return to the United States in June 1966, General McCutcheon served almost four years as deputy chief of staff (air), at Headquarters Marine Corps, and earned a Gold Star in lieu of a second Distinguished Service Medal.

1970s
Nominated for promotion to lieutenant general, his nomination was approved by President  Nixon on February 5, 1970, and confirmed by the Senate on February 24, 1970. After his promotion to that rank on February 26, 1970, he returned to the Republic of Vietnam for duty as commanding general, III Marine Amphibious Force. For exceptionally meritorious service in this assignment through January 1971, he was awarded his third Distinguished Service Medal. At the time of his retirement, he was special assistant to the commandant of the Marine Corps.

Promotion to general and retirement
McCutcheon was nominated for his fourth star and appointed assistant commandant of the Marine Corps in 1970 by President Nixon, although he was unable to assume the post because of ill health. However, because of his distinguished career as a Marine, Congress passed special legislation which provided he be placed on the retired list with the rank of general.

On July 1, 1971, General McCutcheon received his fourth star and was placed on the retired list.  He died of cancer on July 13, 1971, at the National Naval Medical Center, Bethesda, Maryland. He is buried in Arlington National Cemetery.

Decorations
A complete list of his decorations and medals include:

See also

 List of 1st Marine Aircraft Wing commanders

References

General Keith B. McCutcheon, USMC, Who's Who in Marine Corps History, History Division, United States Marine Corps.
Keith B. McCutcheon, General, United States Marine Corps, Arlington National Cemetery profile.
History of Marine Corps Aviation, AcePilots.com.

1915 births
1971 deaths
United States Marine Corps personnel of World War II
United States Marine Corps personnel of the Korean War
United States Marine Corps personnel of the Vietnam War
United States Naval Aviators
United States Marine Corps generals
Assistant Commandants of the United States Marine Corps
Recipients of the Gallantry Cross (Vietnam)
Recipients of the Distinguished Flying Cross (United States)
Recipients of the Legion of Merit
Recipients of the Silver Star
Recipients of the Navy Distinguished Service Medal
Recipients of the Air Medal
Carnegie Mellon University alumni
Massachusetts Institute of Technology alumni
Burials at Arlington National Cemetery